

2010

Non-circulating coins

Circulating coins

Medals

2011

Non-circulating coins

Circulating coins

Medals

2012

Non-circulating coins

Circulating coins

Medals

2013

Non-circulating coins

Circulating coins

Medals

2014

Non-circulating coins

Circulating coins

Medals

2015

Non-circulating coins

Circulating coins

Medals

2016

Non-circulating coins

Circulating coins

Medals

2017

Non-circulating coins

Circulating coins

Medals

2018

Non-circulating coins

Circulating coins

Medals

2019

Non-circulating coins

Circulating coins

Medals

Notes 
  Although technically a circulating coin, no dollar coins have been struck for circulation since 2011.  Dollar coins are struck for circulation when the economy needs them.

  This is a non-circulating variety of a circulating coin.

References 

Commemorative coins of the United States